The 9th Cavalry Division (9. Kavallerie-Division) was a unit of the German Army in World War I. The division was formed on the mobilization of the German Army in August 1914. The division was dissolved in March 1918.

Combat chronicle 
It was initially assigned to II Cavalry Corps, which preceded the 1st and 2nd Armies on the Western Front. On 27 November 1914, it was transferred to Russia. It was dismounted in October 1916 and dissolved on 3 March 1918.

A more detailed combat chronicle can be found at the German-language version of this article.

Order of Battle on mobilisation 
On formation, in August 1914, the component units of the division were:

13th Cavalry Brigade (from VII Corps District)
4th (Westphalian) Cuirassiers "von Driesen"
8th (1st Westphalian) Hussars "Emperor Nicholas II of Russia"
14th Cavalry Brigade (from VII Corps District)
11th (2nd Westphalian) Hussars
5th (Westphalian) Uhlans
19th Cavalry Brigade (from X Corps District)
19th (Oldenburg) Dragoons
13th (1st Hannover) King's Uhlans
Horse Artillery Abteilung of the 10th (1st Hannover) Field Artillery "von Scharnhorst" Regiment
7th Machine Gun Detachment
Pioneer Detachment
Signals Detachment
Heavy Wireless Station 21
Light Wireless Station 8
Light Wireless Station 17
Cavalry Motorised Vehicle Column 9

See: Table of Organisation and Equipment

Changes in organization 
13th Cavalry Brigade Staff on 8 February 1916 joined the Warsaw General Government as the Cavalry Inspectorate
14th Cavalry Brigade joined Guard Cavalry Division on 23 February 1918
19th Cavalry Brigade joined Guard Cavalry Division on 8 April 1917

See also 

German Army (German Empire)
German cavalry in World War I
German Army order of battle (1914)

References

Bibliography 
 
 

Cavalry divisions of Germany in World War I
Military units and formations established in 1914
Military units and formations disestablished in 1918